In 2001, Chilean rock band La Ley participated in MTV's Unplugged series in Miami, Florida, US.  The album MTV Unplugged contains the recordings of the live concert and is to this date the band's best selling album, with sales of 1.5 million copies worldwide. 

The album emphasizes the band's alt-rock 1990s material rather than their 1980s pop rock sound. Mexican singer Ely Guerra is featured as a guest singer on "El duelo". La Ley is augmented for this appearance with more musicians and a string section.

Track listing

Sales and certifications

Personnel

La Ley 
Mauricio Clavería - Drums
Beto Cuevas - Vocals, guitar
Pedro Frugone - Guitar

Others 
Richard Bravo - Percussion
Juan Coderch - Percussion
Archie Frugone - Bass guitar
Ely Guerra - Vocals, guitar
Bambi Natisse - Backing vocals
Kenny O'Brian - Backing vocals
Giza Vatcky - Backing vocals
Peter Wallis - Keyboards
Toshi Yanagi - Guitar
Matthew Della Polla and the Miami Strings - Strings

References

External links 
 laleysite.com

La Ley (band) live albums
Mtv Unplugged (Ley, La album)
2001 live albums
Latin Grammy Award for Best Rock Album by a Duo or Group with Vocal
Spanish-language live albums